Kyle Evans Gay is an American politician. She is a Democratic member of the Delaware Senate representing District 5.

References

Living people
Place of birth missing (living people)
Year of birth missing (living people)
21st-century American politicians
Democratic Party Delaware state senators
Brown University alumni
Boston University School of Law alumni
People from Wilmington, Delaware